Alan Hardwick (born 1949) is a former journalist and television presenter. He was the Lincolnshire Police and Crime Commissioner from 2012 to 2016.

Early life
He is the son of a Derbyshire coal miner, living on Chesterfield Road in Staveley. He attended Netherthorpe Grammar School in the town.

Broadcasting career

Newspapers
Alan Hardwick began his working life as an assistant in the men's clothing department of the Swallows department store (now gone) in Chesterfield. The news editor of the Derbyshire Times had his suits made in the store and another assistant, Vincent Cleary, arranged an interview for Alan at the newspaper. He became a junior reporter in 1965, One of the first stories he covered was the death of Horace Oakley, the Latin master at his old school and the man who first advised him to pursue journalism as a career.

Hardwick left Derbyshire to become a sub-editor with the Wiltshire Gazette and Herald in Swindon in 1969, then moved on to become a news editor for the now defunct Lincolnshire Chronicle. Later he became district editor of the Faversham News in Kent. After a short spell in the southeast he was a sub-editor and sports editor for the Scarborough Evening News.

Television
From 1973 to 2002 Hardwick was a senior journalist, presenter, producer and director at Yorkshire Television (YTV), presenting the Calendar South news bulletin. He had first encountered YTV when covering a story at Butlin's in Filey. The staff TV presenter, who was travelling by helicopter, was unable to land due to fog, so Alan stepped in. 

From 2002 to 2003 he presented his own daily news/current affairs programme on Radio Lincolnshire.

Since 2003 Hardwick has been a self-employed voice-over artist and PR consultant.

Police and Crime Commissioner
On 15 November 2012 Hardwick was elected the first Police and Crime Commissioner for the Lincolnshire Police area. Standing as an independent candidate, winning in the second ballot with a majority of 4,135.

References

External links
 
Alan Hardwick – Yorkshire TV's `Mr. Versatile' – interview by Tom Bates.
 Radio – Digital Spy Forums

1949 births
Living people
English male journalists
English radio presenters
English television presenters
English male voice actors
People from Staveley, Derbyshire
Police and crime commissioners in England
Independent police and crime commissioners